SIN-Atra is a heavy metal compilation album by various artists, released as a heavy metal tribute album to Frank Sinatra. The album was produced by Bob Kulick (guitar/backing vocals) and Brett Chassen (drums/backing vocals), featuring Billy Sheehan (bass), Doug Katsaros (keyboards, orchestration), and various guest vocalists. This was the last compilation contribution released by Jani Lane before his death in August 2011.

Track listing

References

2011 compilation albums
Frank Sinatra tribute albums
Eagle Records albums